Nommay is a commune in the Doubs department in the Bourgogne-Franche-Comté region in eastern France.

Geography

Population

Sports

Stage 8 of the 2012 Tour de France on 8 July raced through Nommay.

The Grand Prix Nommay is a cyclo-cross race held in January which is part of the UCI Cyclo-cross World Cup competition.

See also
 Communes of the Doubs department

References

External links

 Nommay on the intercommunal Web site of the department 

Communes of Doubs
County of Montbéliard